Acacia barringtonensis, commonly known as Barrington wattle, is a shrub belonging to the genus Acacia and the subgenus Phyllodineae endemic to New South Wales.

Description
It has grey-green phyllodes that can have white to grey hairs.

Taxonomy
The species was first formally described by the botanist Mary Tindale in 1975 as part of the work Notes on Australian taxa of Acacia as published in the journal Telopea. It was reclassified as Racosperma barringtonense in 2003 by Leslie Pedley then transferred back to the genus Acacia in 2006.

The specific epithet is a reference to Barrington Tops located in the Mount Royal Range where the type specimen was found. It is closely related to Acacia clunies-rossiae, Acacia caesiella and Acacia dorothea.

Distribution
The shrub is found in north eastern New South Wales and is commonly located in the Great Dividing Range from Gibraltar Range National Park in the north down to Barrington Tops National Park in the south where it is often situated around creeks and among or along the edges of swamps growing in granite or basalt based soils as a part of Eucalyptus woodland communities.

See also
 List of Acacia species

References

barringtonensis
Flora of New South Wales
Plants described in 1975